Ramiro Rodrigues Valente (born 11 February 1933), simply known as Ramiro, is a Brazilian retired football manager and player. A versatile player, he was mostly utilized as a central defender or a defensive midfielder, but could also play as a full back or a right midfielder.

His brother Álvaro was also a footballer. Both played together at Jabaquara, Santos and Atlético Madrid.

Honours

Player
Santos
Campeonato Paulista: 1955, 1956, 1958
Torneio Rio – São Paulo: 1959

Atlético Madrid
Copa del Generalísimo: 1959–60, 1960–61, 1964–65
UEFA Cup Winners' Cup: 1961–62

References

External links

1933 births
Living people
Footballers from São Paulo
Brazilian footballers
Association football defenders
Association football midfielders
Association football utility players
Jabaquara Atlético Clube players
Fluminense FC players
Santos FC players
La Liga players
Atlético Madrid footballers
Brazil international footballers
Brazilian expatriate footballers
Brazilian expatriate sportspeople in Spain
Expatriate footballers in Spain
Brazilian football managers
Campeonato Brasileiro Série A managers
Santos FC managers